Charles Clapp Lockwood (September 2, 1877 – September 21, 1958) was an American lawyer and a Republican Party politician from New York. He was a member of the New York State Senate, 1915-22 (4th District 1915-18, 7th District 1919-22) and a justice of the New York Supreme Court 2nd District, 1932-47. He is probably best known for presiding the Joint Legislative Committee on Housing, also known as the Lockwood Committee (1919-1922), investigating rents and housing in New York City after World War I.

Early life
He was born on September 2, 1877, in Brooklyn, the son of James K. P. Lockwood (1845–1922) and Katherine Marshall Lockwood. After working in a drugstore in his boyhood and in a lumber yard, he attended evening high school and eventually graduated in 1900 at the New York Law School. Prior to his graduation he worked as an office boy and clerk in the law office of Jasper W. Gilbert, a former justice at the New York Supreme Court. Eventually, he became an associate of the firm and would remain for 14 years.

In 1908 he established his own law firm. He ran a successful and lucrative practice and became financially independent.

Political career
Although Justice Gilbert was a Democrat, well connected to the Tammany Hall political machine, Lockwood turned to the Republican Party, and became active in the local Brooklyn Republican clubs. In November 1913, he was elected to the New York State Assembly (Kings Co., 5th D.), and was a member in 1914. The same year he was elected to the New York State Senate, where he sat from 1915 to 1922 in the 138th, 139th, 140th, 141st, 142nd, 143rd, 144th and 145th New York State Legislatures. He drew support from the Citizens Union, one of the United States' first good government groups.

The Republican Lockwood was a prolific legislator. According to The Brooklyn Daily Eagle as a senator he "sponsored and passed more big legislation than any two members of that body put together during the corresponding period". As chairman of the New York Senate Committee on Public Education, he introduced legislation such as the Teachers' Salary Increase act, which did much to prevent the breakdown of the school system, due to the failure of teachers' pay to follow the soaring cost of living during the war. Because of a nervous breakdown, he was unable to defend the bill in the Senate. The bill advanced nevertheless. He also introduced a bill to sponsor the establishment of kindergartens in public schools. These efforts earned him the support of teachers' unions and the female vote.

Lockwood Committee
Lockwood headed the Joint Legislative Committee on Housing, also known as the Lockwood Committee, that was set up in 1919 to investigate renting and building conditions in the City of New York and ended a spate of rent-raising as a result of the housing shortage after World War I. The Committee found that the housing conditions at the time constituted a serious menace to public health in New York. There was a shortage of around 80,000 low-priced homes. Some 400,000 persons were directly affected by the scarcity in affordable dwellings and the poor quality of the existing ones. The proportion of dwellers per square foot was three to four times that of the pre-War level and considered a "menace to lives, health, morals and safety of the entire community."

The committee uncovered corruption and wrongdoing at every level of the housing industry at a series of hearings and investigations. At the outset landlords who charged tenants usurious rents were in the committee's spotlight, but subsequently labor unions and building material suppliers were found implicated in a racket that inflated housing costs. Banking and insurance practices in the real estate market were also examined and deemed inadequate. Due to the work of the Committee's chief counsel, the consumer rights attorney Samuel Untermyer, the investigation exposed that commercial mortgage lenders charged up fees and expenses worth between 20 percent and 50 percent of the initial loan.

In April 1920, the Committee issued a series of recommendations to diminish the rent spiral, resulting in the passage of twelve laws in the Anti-Rent Profiteering Bill. Property owners opposed the bill because it decreased landlords' unlimited control over property and introduced courts into the up to that time private landlord/tenant relationship. The new laws required that tenants receive 30 days notice before eviction, and also introduced certain strict conditions for eviction. The Committee also made recommendations to stimulate housing construction. New laws granted local authorities the power to use tax incentives to encourage new construction and also allowed municipalities to invest in State Land Bank bonds, in an effort to divert investment capital into much needed housing construction.

The enactment of the laws was only the first stage. The real estate sector saw them as unconstitutional and began a legal fight that would be waged all the way through the State courts and on up to the United States Supreme Court. In defense of the bills he had sponsored and largely helped to draw, Lockwood was actively involved in the litigation. The decision of the highest New York State and Federal courts to uphold the validity of the laws was a severe blow to those who had capitalized for their profit the housing shortage growing out of the war.

Public office
His tenure as chairman of the Lockwood increased his reputation. At the New York City election, 1921, he ran unsuccessfully on the Republican Coalition ticket for New York City Comptroller. After nine years of public life and citing ill health, he did not seek re-election for a new term in the Senate in 1922, and focused on his family and private law practice. In 1923, he was considered for a federal judgeship in Brooklyn. However, the business and labor interests that had been under scrutiny of the Lockwood Committee effectively opposed his nomination.

In 1926, he was appointed by Governor Alfred E. Smith to the New York Transit Commission. Lockwood tried to unify the subway system under municipal authority and was a strong proponent of the five-cent fare, a contentious issue, which in New York City had become a fundamental right that no politician could oppose without severe political consequences. At the New York state election, 1928, he ran on the Republican ticket for Lieutenant Governor of New York with Albert Ottinger for governor, but was defeated by Democrat Herbert H. Lehman, who ran with Franklin D. Roosevelt.

Supreme Court Justice
In 1931, Lockwood was elected a justice of the New York Supreme Court (2nd D.). He was re-elected in 1945, and retired on December 31, 1947, at the end of the year that he reached the mandatory retirement age. After his retirement he continued to act as an official referee for the Court, handling complicated land acquisition cases in which the City of New York was defrauded millions of dollars each year by corrupt officials and crooked lawyers. He resigned in January 1954.

In his final years, Governor Thomas E. Dewey appointed Lockwood as a member of the Temporary Long Island Railroad Commission in 1950, installed after the Richmond Hill train crash that claimed 79 lives, and in 1954 he served as chairman of the Special Legislative Committee on Integrity and Ethical Standards in Government after it was discovered that influential politicians acquired substantial blocks of stock in harness racing tracks and racing associations. The Committee proposed the first generally applicable state ethics law in New York. He was associated with the Guggenheimer & Untermyer law firm and was president of the Board of Trustees of the Brooklyn Law School.

Death and legacy
He died of a heart attack on September 21, 1958, in Brooklyn, New York City, at the age of 81. He was survived by his second wife, Hilda Bisset Lockwood, and a son John Marshall Lockwood. His first wife, Patricia Bleiler Lockwood, whom he had married in 1906, died in 1957.

References

Sources
 Fine, Sidney (1995). Without Blare of Trumpets: Walter Drew, the National Erectors' Association, and the Open Shop Movement, 1903-57, University of Michigan Press, 
 Fogelson, Robert M. (2013). The Great Rent Wars: New York, 1917-1929, Yale University Press, 
 Roess, Roger P. & Gene Sansone (2013). The Wheels That Drove New York: A History of the New York City Transit System, Springer, 

1877 births
1958 deaths
Republican Party New York (state) state senators
Politicians from Brooklyn
Republican Party members of the New York State Assembly
New York Supreme Court Justices